The Rolling Stones' 1965 1st European Tour was the first concert tour of Scandinavia by the band. The tour commenced on March 26 and concluded on April 2, 1965.

The Rolling Stones
 Mick Jagger - lead vocals, harmonica, percussion
 Keith Richards - guitar, backing vocals
 Brian Jones - guitar, harmonica, backing vocals
 Bill Wyman - bass guitar, backing vocals
 Charlie Watts - drums

Tour set list
"Everybody Needs Somebody To Love"
"Tell Me"
"Around And Around"
"Time Is On My Side"
"It's All Over Now"
"Little Red Rooster"
"Route 66"
"The Last Time"

Tour dates 
 26/03/1965 Odense, Denmark, Fyns Forum (2 shows)
 28/03/1965 Copenhagen, Denmark, Tivolis Koncertsal (2 shows)
 30/03/1965 Copenhagen, Denmark, Tivolis Koncertsal (2 shows)
 31/03/1965 Gothenburg, Sweden, Masshallen (2 shows)
 01/04/1965 Stockholm, Sweden, Kungliga Tennishallen (1st shows)
 02/04/1965 Stockholm, Sweden, Kungliga Tennishallen

References 
 Carr, Roy.  The Rolling Stones: An Illustrated Record.  Harmony Books, 1976.  

The Rolling Stones concert tours
1965 concert tours
1965 in Europe
Concert tours of Europe